Tetbury Road railway station was built by the Cheltenham & Great Western Union Railway to serve the Gloucestershire villages of Kemble and Coates, and the town of Tetbury.

History
The station was situated on the Golden Valley Line, to the north of the bridge where the line passes over the Fosse Way. The site was carefully chosen so as to be outside the land around Kemble, which was owned by Robert Gordon, who forbade the construction of a public station on his land.

The first section of the C&GWU from Swindon to Cirencester opened on 31 May 1841; there were no stations between Minety and Cirencester. A station was also built at the junction, but this had no road access, being intended for interchange purposes. In the meantime, the C&GWU had been purchased by the GWR on 1 July 1843.

During the conversion of the Cirencester branch from 7 ft  in gauge to standard gauge, which took place between 22–27 May 1872, Cirencester passengers used Tetbury Road station, and were conveyed between the station and Cirencester by omnibus.

When road access to Kemble station was provided from 1 May 1882, Tetbury Road was closed to passengers. The station closed completely on 1 July 1963.

Route

Notes

References

Disused railway stations in Gloucestershire
Former Great Western Railway stations
Railway stations in Great Britain opened in 1845
Railway stations in Great Britain closed in 1882